The Jardin géo-botanique (1.3 hectares) is a municipal botanical garden located at 1, Place Mathias, Chalon-sur-Saône, Saône-et-Loire, Bourgogne, France. It is open daily without charge.

The garden was established in 1953 by the Society of Natural History and Mycology of Saône-et-Loire under active direction of its president, Dr. Gilbert Durand, and has been maintained by the city since 1959. Today the garden contains about 600 plant taxa set within eight areas of regional scenery, including water, limestone, granite, swamp, pine lands, Provence, aromatic and medicinal plants, and a perennial garden.

See also 
 List of botanical gardens in France

References 
 Jardin géo-botanique
 Jardinez entry
 Gralon entry (French)
 Conservatoire des Jardins et Paysages entry (French)
 Petit Futé entry (French)

Gardens in Saône-et-Loire
Botanical gardens in France